Bamboo (Spanish: Bambú) is a 1945 Spanish historical comedy film directed by José Luis Sáenz de Heredia and starring Imperio Argentina. It is set in 1898 during the Cuban War of Independence.

Cast
 Gabriel Algara 
 Manuel Arbó
 Imperio Argentina    
 Fernando Fernán Gómez    
 Fernando Fernández de Córdoba  
 Félix Fernandez 
 Emilio García Ruiz  
 José María Lado   
 Julia Lajos
 Mary Lamar   
 Sara Montiel  
 Nicolás D. Perchicot  
 Luis Peña    
 Alberto Romea 
 María Vicent

References

Bibliography 
 Bentley, Bernard. A Companion to Spanish Cinema. Boydell & Brewer 2008.
 Mira, Alberto. Historical Dictionary of Spanish Cinema. Scarecrow Press, 2010.

External links 
 

Suevia Films films
1945 films
1940s historical comedy films
Spanish historical comedy films
1940s Spanish-language films
Films directed by José Luis Sáenz de Heredia
Films set in the 1890s
Films scored by Ernesto Halffter
Spanish black-and-white films
1940s Spanish films